Qaleh Tak (also Romanized as Qal‘eh Tak; also known as Ghal‘eh Tak) is a village in Kiar-e Gharbi Rural District, in the Central District of Kiar County, Chaharmahal and Bakhtiari Province, Iran. At the 2006 census, its population was 822, in 208 families.

References 

Populated places in Kiar County